The Dourados River is a tributary of the Brilhante River in Mato Grosso do Sul state, southwestern Brazil.

References
Brazilian Ministry of Transport
 Rand McNally, The New International Atlas, 1993.

Rivers of Mato Grosso do Sul